The 1873 Minnesota gubernatorial election was held on November 4, 1873 to elect the governor of Minnesota.

Results

References

1873
Minnesota
gubernatorial
November 1873 events